Collyris is a genus of tiger beetles in the family Cicindelidae. Species are found in Asia. The genus contains the following species:

 Collyris brevipennis Horn, 1901
 Collyris colossea Naviaux, 1994
 Collyris dohrni Chaudoir, 1860
 Collyris dormeri Horn, 1898
 Collyris elegans (Vanderl., 1829)
 Collyris gigas Lesne, 1901
 Collyris longicollis (Fabricius, 1787)
 Collyris mniszechi Chaudoir, 1864
 Collyris robusta Dohrn, 1891
 Collyris subtilesculpta Horn, 1901

References

External links 
 
 
 
 Collyris at insectoid.info

Cicindelidae